Martiniana Po is a comune (municipality) in the Province of Cuneo in the Italian region Piedmont, located about  southwest of Turin and about  northwest of Cuneo. It is located in the lower Valle Po across the Po River.

Martiniana Po borders the following municipalities: Brondello, Brossasco, Gambasca, Isasca, and Revello.

References

Cities and towns in Piedmont